Lenox Hill Hospital (LHH) is a nationally ranked 450-bed non-profit, tertiary, research and academic medical center located on the Upper East Side of  Manhattan in New York City, servicing the tri-state area. LHH is one of the region's many university-level academic medical centers. The hospital is owned by Northwell Health, the largest private employer in the state of New York. LHH serves as a clinical campus for the Donald and Barbara Zucker School of Medicine at Hofstra/Northwell, which is owned by the health system in a partnership with Hofstra University.

It was founded in 1857 as the German Dispensary. It currently consists of ten buildings and has occupied the present site in Manhattan since 1869, when it was known as the German Hospital. In 2007, the Manhattan Eye, Ear and Throat Hospital was incorporated into Lenox Hill Hospital.

The hospital is located on a city block bounded on the north and south by East 77th and 76th Streets, and on the west and east by Park Avenue and Lexington Avenue. The New York City Subway's 77th Street station is on the same block.

History

19th century: German Hospital 

In 1857, a group of community leaders recognized the need for medical services among the immigrant community and came together to found the German Dispensary. Physicians Ernest Krackowizer and Abraham Jacobi were among the founders. Its purpose, according to the constitution adopted January 19, 1857, was "to give medical advice in their own tongue to inhabitants of New York City who speak the German language, a great many indigent sick persons, ignorant of the English tongue." On May 28, 1857, the dispensary opened  at 132 New Canal Street, on the north side between Chrystie and Forsyth Streets. (The location had been 210 Walker Street before the street's renaming.) In 1862, the dispensary moved to larger quarters at 8 East 3rd Street.

The German Hospital of the City of New York was incorporated by the New York State Legislature April 13th, 1861, and its first board of directors was organized February 15, 1862. A plot of ground situated on Park Avenue and 77th Street was leased to them by the city for 50 years at a nominal rent, and they purchased six additional lots on 76th Street. The plan was to erect two pavilions, extending along 77th Street, from Park to Lexington Avenues, with an administration building between them. The corner-stone of the western pavilion was laid September 3, 1866. Completion was delayed by a shortage of funds, but finally the hospital opened September 13, 1869. On March 26,1866, the state legislature made the German Dispensary a branch of the German Hospital.

A pavilion for skin diseases opened in 1875; an isolation pavilion in 1880; a women's department in 1882; and in 1884, a new dispensary at 137 Second Avenue, between 8th and 9th Streets. The three-story building was a gift of Anna Ottendorfer and Oswald Ottendorfer, who ran the German-language newspaper New Yorker Staats-Zeitung.

By 1887, the German Hospital and Dispensary was treating 28,000 patients annually, mostly from the local Little Germany neighborhood around First and Second Avenues below 14th Street.

Another wing opened in 1888. A nurses' home opened in 1893, donated by the Ottendorfer family.  A five-story training school for nurses was added in February 1894 at 77th Street and Lexington Avenue, with four young German-American women forming the first class. Until then, nursing attendants and charge nurses had been brought over from Germany. The New York Times noted in an 1899 editorial, "to be a graduate nurse of the German Hospital is a distinction and recommendation for good nursing." A hospital annex, at the corner of 77th Street and Lexington Avenue, also donated by the Ottendorfer family, opened in 1901.

The hospital moved to the 77th Street location entirely in 1905, about the same time that Manhattan's German community was increasingly abandoning Little Germany for the Yorkville neighborhood, within walking distance of the new hospital. New York City deeded to the hospital the square block it occupied for $5,000 in 1907. The dispensary building was sold in 1906 to the German Polyklinik, founded in 1883 – which later changed its name to Stuyvesant Polyclinic Hospital – for $82,000, and a larger dispensary was erected on the northeast corner of 76th Street and Park Avenue, with Ottendorfer's son and daughter providing the balance of the $250,000 cost, in their mother's memory.

The new dispensary building was opened March 16, 1907. In 1908 a new isolation pavilion was inaugurated, as well as a pavilion for tuberculosis patients. In 1910 a separate building for intrathoracic surgery was begun on Lexington Avenue, adjoining the German Hospital Training School for Nurses, and Ottendorfer's daughter donated $100,000 for the creation of the Abraham Jacobi Division for Children. The capacity of the German Hospital in 1915 was 310 beds.

20th century: rename to Lenox Hill Hospital 
In July 1918, the German Hospital was renamed Lenox Hill Hospital, tying it to the Lenox Hill section of the Upper East Side, in an effort to distance the institution from America's enemy in World War I. A movement in 1925 to restore the hospital to its former name, to appeal to potential donors of German descent, was eventually rejected by the board of trustees. It was said at the time that about 95 percent of the doctors, nurses and other employees of the hospital spoke German.

The hospital rejected a proposed merger with Columbia University in February 1919.

In April 1931, the hospital completed a new $2.5 million 11-story building, with a facade made of light brick with limestone trim, on the 76th Street side of the hospital, replacing two apartment houses and several workshops. In December 1931, Winston Churchill was hospitalized there for treatment of injuries suffered when he was run-over by a car after failing to look left when crossing Fifth Avenue. The pioneering children's division, founded by Dr. Abraham Jacobi, was housed on the 11th floor, with other patient rooms on the fourth through ninth floors, and operating rooms on the 10th floor. Another two-story building, containing a ward service, lecture hall and swimming pool, was added next to the main building on the 76th Street side in 1936, at a cost of $150,000.

By 1939, the hospital had annually treated 12,115 patients with bed care, and another 23,099 visited the dispensary for treatment. Adding accident room patients, the hospital treated over 53,000 people in 1939. Because some care was given for free or part-pay, the hospital often ran an operating deficit, just as it did in 1939, when it lost $163,029, down a loss of over $200,000 the previous year, 1938. The hospital's operating loss grew to $284,692 in 1945, which was then a record high. Due to a lack of funds, an anticipated additional new building was delayed for over 20 years, when the Second Century Development Program, designed to raise $10 million, was led by the hospital's president, James Wickersham.

Finally, on the hospital's 100th anniversary, in 1957, it opened a $4.5 million 12-story building on Park Avenue at 77th Street, with a glass and aluminum facade, and a capacity of 180 patient beds. The new building, named the Wollman Pavilion, also housed a mental health unit, and an entire floor was allocated for research on speech and hearing disorders, epilepsy and hemophilia. In 1964, the Charles R. Lachman Community Health Center was added on the south side of 77th Street, between the Wollman Pavilion and the William Black Hall of Nursing, which opened in 1962 (the School of Nursing closed in 1973). The hospital opened its largest building, at 12 stories, in 1976, located at Park Avenue and 76th Street, replacing the Ottendorfer Dispensary, at a cost of $20 million. The modern brick masonry structure, with a fortresslike facade, stood in stark contrast in architectural style of the rest of hospital's buildings. The new building added 180 patient beds, for an overall capacity of 690 beds.

The hospital sent a medical unit to England in 1943 to maintain station hospitals for military personnel. Throughout the remainder of World War II, hospital staff members served in all theaters of war, including with combat forces in the European theater of operations after D-Day.

In 1998, a jury awarded $49 million in an obstetrics case against the hospital, which was one of the largest medical malpractice verdicts in New York City at that time.

21st century 
In 2021, Lenox Hill Hospital was ranked the #4 hospital in New York City as well as in New York State. It was ranked among the nation's top 50 hospitals in neurology & neurosurgery (#23), orthopedics (#25) and ear, nose & throat (#27), cardiology & heart surgery (#28), gynecology (#31), diabetes & endocrinology (#38) and geriatrics (#39), according to U.S. News & World Reports annual survey of America's Best Hospitals.

The hospital's building underwent masonry and roof restorations conducted by Merrit Engineering Consultants, P.C. from 2007 to 2009. Façade restoration, waterproofing, and structural steel repairs were also conducted.

On May 19, 2010, the hospital announced that an agreement had been finalized for it to join the Northwell Health.

In 2014, the old St. Vincent Hospital building that had suddenly closed back in 2010, became Lenox Hill HealthPlex, Manhattan's first freestanding emergency department. This facility is located at 30 7th Avenue between W. 12th and W. 13th Street, walking distance from the 14th Street train station on the west side. This emergency department, just like any other that is a part of a hospital, sees patients whether they come as a walk-in or via an ambulance. If this facility is unable to treat someone, and/or he needs long-term care, he is then transferred to an actual hospital via an ambulance. Since Lenox Hill HealthPlex is a part of Lenox Hill Hospital, patients at times are admitted directly and are brought straight to a bed in the main part of the hospital. This facility also does labs if necessary, as well as CTs and X-rays. If it is unable to perform a given test, such as an MRI, an outside facility can do it, just as with any other emergency department. Lenox Hill HealthPlex has private rooms so that patients can have their privacy. Patients are treated regardless of whether they are insured.

In 2015, Lenox Hill HealthPlex became Lenox Health Greenwich Village. It is the official health and wellness partner of Chelsea Piers and Entertainment Complex.

Significance

Contributions to modern medicine

The hospital became a leading innovator in medical care, developing and implementing many standards and practices that would later become indispensable components of modern medicine.

In 1897, the hospital installed one of the first X-ray machines in America. Ten years later, the hospital established the first physical therapy department in the country. In response to what was becoming a growing public health threat, it was the first general hospital in the U.S. to open a tuberculosis division. In 1973, the Nicholas Institute of Sports Medicine and Athletic Trauma became the first hospital-based center in the nation for the study of sports medicine.

Early on, the hospital established itself as one of the nation's leading hospitals for cardiac care. In 1938, the first angiocardiograph in the country was performed at the hospital, and in 1955 the hospital became one of the first in New York City to open a cardiac catheterization laboratory. Ten years later, the hospital opened the first cardiac-care unit in the metropolitan New York area.

In 1978, the first coronary angioplasties in the country were performed at Lenox Hill Hospital and at St. Mary's Hospital in San Francisco, California. In 1994, Lenox Hill Hospital surgeons pioneered minimally invasive direct coronary artery bypass surgery and in 2000, the hospital was the first in the U.S. to perform endoscopic radial artery harvesting. In 2003, the first drug-coated stent approved by the U.S. Food and Drug Administration (FDA) was implanted at the hospital. It is also one of the first hospitals in the nation to acquire a state-of-the-art robotic cardiac system, which allows surgeons to perform minimally invasive heart-bypass surgery.

In 2000, Lenox Hill Hospital became the sponsor of Manhattan Eye, Ear and Throat Hospital.

Continuing its tradition of care during times of crisis, the hospital assembled a disaster team to care for casualties of the September 11 attacks at the World Trade Center in 2001. Emergency crews were sent to Ground Zero and supply runs to the area were conducted to aid the rescue workers. The hospital set up a free walk-in Crisis Counseling Center, staffed by the hospital's psychiatrists and therapists, and the blood donor center was expanded to accommodate the thousands of people who came to the hospital to give blood.

In 2007, the hospital celebrated its 150th anniversary, and expanded its dedication to the New York City community by opening a new, state-of-the-art emergency department, the Anne and Isidore Falk Center for Emergency Care at Lenox Hill Hospital.

Medical milestones and pioneers 
Many important milestones in the advancement of medical knowledge have been made at the hospital, including:

 Introduction of antiseptic methods in obstetrics
 Installation of one of the first X-ray machines in America in 1897
 First tuberculosis pavilion in any American hospital
 First hemophilia center
 Introduction of the technique for bone marrow examination in 1931
 Development of the specialty of thoracic surgery
 First successful esophagectomy for carcinoma
 First surgical treatment of undescended testicles
 First angiocardiogram in the United States
 First coronary angioplasty in the United States
 Implantation of the first drug-eluting stent in the United States

 First American hospital to use an operative 3D exoscope in Neurosurgery

Many medical pioneers were early members of the hospital's attending staff. Among them were:

 Henry Jacques Garrigues introduced antiseptic obstetrics to North America
 Willy Meyer, M.D. performed some of the earliest pulmonary surgery in America
 Abraham Jacobi, M.D. the father of American pediatrics
 Leo Buerger, M.D. described the disease that bears his name
 Carl Eggers, M.D., and Dewitt Stetten, M.D. founding members of the American College of Surgeons
 Franz Torek, M.D. performed the first successful esophagectomy for carcinoma and also developed the surgical treatment of undescended testicles
 William H. Stewart, M.D. a former director of radiology, performed the first angiocardiogram in the United States in 1938.
 Simon Stertzer, M.D. of Lenox Hill Hospital in New York and Richard K. Myler, M.D. of St. Mary's Hospital in San Francisco performed the first coronary angioplasties in the United States on the same day, March 1, 1978

Awards 
Lenox Hill Hospital consistently ranks with the nation’s best on the U.S. News & World Report: Best Hospital rankings. As of the 2021-22 rankings, Lenox is ranked as #23 in neurology & neurosurgery, #25 in orthopedics, #27 in ear, nose & throat, #28 in cardiology and heart surgery, #31 in gynecology, #38 in diabetes and endocrinology, and #39 in geriatrics.

Current use
Lenox Hill Hospital today provides a wide range of inpatient and outpatient medical, surgical, cardiovascular, orthopedic and obstetric services. The hospital has both primary care and specialty outpatient clinics, an ambulance service and an emergency department. Special programs and services include neurosurgery, sports medicine, interventional cardiology and a cardiovascular surgery program that are among the busiest and most highly regarded in the region; a New York State-designated AIDS center program; a high-risk neonatal care service; an obstetric service; an ambulatory surgery program; a renal dialysis service; and a community health education and outreach program. Other licensed services include cystoscopy, diagnostic radiology services including CT and MRI scanning, nuclear medicine, and therapeutic radiology. Outpatient services include primary care medicine, pediatrics, prenatal care and family planning, physical therapy, audiology, speech/language pathology, and social work. The hospital also provides inpatient and outpatient adult mental health services. Its ambulance service primary territory is East 59th to 96th Streets, from Central Park to the East River.

In 2019, the hospital had 4,381 births, 39,915 hospital discharges, 55,211 emergency visits and 20,503 surgeries.

Notable people

Faculty 

 David J. Langer, MD, is an American neurosurgeon and the chair of neurosurgery at Lenox Hill Hospital in New York City. In addition, he is a professor of neurosurgery and radiology at the Donald and Barbara Zucker School of Medicine at Hofstra/Northwell. Langer was a star on the 2020 Netflix docu-series Lenox Hill. which featured the Lenox Hill Neurosurgery Department. Lenox Hill Neurosurgery ranked #23 in U.S. News & World Reports Best Hospitals for 2020-2021 as well as #28 in Newsweeks "World's Best Specialized Hospitals" ranking along with the speciality's Cardiology and Orthopedics.

Deaths 

 newspaper and magazine publisher Frank A. Munsey (1925)
 1940 Republican presidential nominee Wendell Willkie (1944)
 cosmetics pioneer Elizabeth Arden (1966)
 President Franklin D. Roosevelt's adviser and speechwriter Samuel Rosenman (1973)
 television host Ed Sullivan (1974)
 Vice President and New York Governor Nelson Rockefeller (1979)
 orchestra conductor William Steinberg (1978)
 actor Will Lee (1982)
 television host Jack Barry (1984)
 Popeye voice actor Jack Mercer (1984)
 stage, TV & film actress Anne Baxter (1985)
 CBS correspondent Charles Collingwood (1985)
 political journalist Theodore H. White (1986)
 cruise ship terror victim Marilyn Klinghoffer (1986)
 Random House co-founder S. Klopper (1986)
 actor/singer Lanny Ross (1988)
 modern dancer Alvin Ailey (1989)
 fashion editor Diana Vreeland (1989)
 New York radio news broadcaster Stan Z. Burns (1990)
 opera singer Ron Bottcher (1991)
 actor/singer Allan Jones (1992)
 radio and TV host Fred Robbins (1992)
 actress Myrna Loy (1993)
 classical music, opera singer Tatiana Troyanos (1993)
 choreographer Erick Hawkins (1994)
 lawyer Simon Rifkind (1995)
 New York TV news host Roger Grimsby (1995)
 alleged Soviet spy Alger Hiss (1996)
 RCA chairman Robert Sarnoff (1997)
 NBC legal analyst Jay Monahan (1998)
 writer Malachi Martin (1999)
 oil tycoon and New York Jets owner Leon Hess (1999)
 writer William H. Whyte (1999)
 actress Sylvia Sidney (1999)
 New York TV news anchorman Jim Jensen (1999)
 U.S. Communist Party perennial presidential candidate Gus Hall (2000)
 General Douglas MacArthur's wife Jean MacArthur (2000)
 theatrical producer Alexander H. Cohen (2000)
 television sports journalist Dick Schaap (2001)
 sports announcer Marty Glickman (2001)
 film director Herbert Ross (2001)
 scenic designer Kathleen Ankers (2001)
 actress Kathleen Freeman (2001)
 novelist Olivia Goldsmith (2004)
 book publisher Roger Williams Straus Jr. (2004)
 comedian Nipsey Russell (2005)
 congressman Bertram L. Podell (2005)
 marathon runner Ryan Shay (2007)
 actress Natasha Richardson (2009)
 dancer and choreographer Frankie Manning (2009)
 television sing-along host Mitch Miller (2010)
 writer Louis Auchincloss (2010)
 restaurateur Elaine Kaufman (2010)
 composer/musician George Shearing (2011)
 actor Tony Musante (2013)
 musician Bob Belden (2015)
 Metropolitan Opera chairman and Goldman Sachs partner James S. Marcus (2015)
CBS News executive Sanford Socolow (2015)
 journalist and author Lillian Ross (2017)
 founder of The Fashion Calendar and industry leader Ruth Finley (2018)
 Presidential speechwriter Ray Price (2019)
 Manhattan District Attorney Robert Morgenthau (2019)

See also 
 Lenox Hill (TV series)
 List of hospitals in New York City

References

External links

 

Hospital buildings completed in 1884
Hospital buildings completed in 1888
Hospital buildings completed in 1905
Hospital buildings completed in 1957
Hospital buildings completed in 1976
1857 establishments in New York (state)
Hospitals established in 1857
Hospitals in Manhattan
Non-profit organizations based in New York City
Teaching hospitals in New York City
Upper East Side
Northwell Health